Revue Records was an American subsidiary record label of MCA. Revue was operated by the same management team that ran Universal City (UNI) Records. Revue was created in 1967 to exclusively cater to the R&B market. The label primarily released singles, but from 1968 until its dissolution, albums were released. In 1971, MCA merged Uni Records and other subsidiaries to become MCA Records.

Roster 
The label initially bought master recordings to release, but artist who recorded for the label include:

 Garland Green 
 The Mirettes 
 Jack Montgomery
 The Chi-Lites
 Marvin L. Sims
 Darrow Fletcher
 Alder Ray
 The Sunlovers
 Lee Charles
 Tony Borders
 Marvin Holmes & The Uptights
 Third Avenue Blues Band
 Mike & The Censations
 David T. Walker
 Eddie & Ernie
 Joyce Hopson
 Charles Lamont

Discography

Albums

References

External links 

 Revue Album Discography on BSN Pubs
 Revue on Soulful Kinda Music

Soul music record labels
Record labels based in California
Defunct record labels of the United States